Sama is the sixteenth studio album by Serbian singer Dragana Mirković. It was released in 2000.

Track listing
Sama (Alone)
Svatovi (Nuptial)
Nemam ja milion sudbina (I don't have million destinies)
Ostani (Stay)
Veruj, veruj (Believe, believe)
Ja uspomenu čuvam (I keep my memory)
Ako pitaš kako sam (If you ask me how am I doing)
S' vremena na vreme (Now and then)
Možda (Maybe)
Da li ti žališ me (Do you regret for me)
Ceo život jedna ljubav (Whole life one love)

References

2000 albums
Dragana Mirković albums